Newton Heath and Moston is a Manchester Metrolink tram stop on the Oldham and Rochdale Line (ORL), in the Newton Heath area of Manchester, England.

The stop is the partial replacement of Dean Lane railway station which was closed in 2009 to enable conversion of the Oldham Loop Line to Metrolink services with the station opening on 13 June 2012.

History

Service pattern 

Connecting bus routes
The station is served by several bus services that either stop outside the station or on nearby Oldham Road and Old Church Street.

Outside the station, First Greater Manchester service 52 runs northbound to Pendleton via Harpurhey and Cheetham Hill and southbound to Failsworth via Newton Heath centre, First service 182 runs from Manchester to Rochdale via Chadderton, Royton and Shaw and Crompton.

On Oldham Road, First services 83, 180 and 184 provide frequent buses between Manchester and Oldham with the 83 continuing to Sholver and the 180/184 running to Saddleworth plus Huddersfield (184). In addition to the 182, First services 24 and 181 also run from Manchester to Rochdale via Chadderton, Royton and Shaw and Crompton (181).

On Old Church Street, Stagecoach service 171 runs to Withington Community Hospital via Gorton and Levenshulme, while Stotts Tours service 151 (which also stops on Oldham Road) runs between Hightown and Hollinwood and the 396, operated by Manchester Community Transport runs to Ashton-under-Lyne via Hollinwood.

References

External links

LRTA Oldham Rochdale line
Metrolink stop information
Newton Heath and Moston area map

Tram stops in Manchester
Railway stations in Great Britain opened in 2012
Tram stops on the East Didsbury to Rochdale line